Giovanni Battaglin (born 22 July 1951) is an Italian professional road racing cyclist. The highlight of his career was his overall win in the 1981 Giro d'Italia. He also won the 1981 Vuelta a España.

Early years
Battaglin was born in Marostica, province of Vicenza. Battaglin won the 1972 Amateur Giro d'Italia and turned professional the following year with the Jollj Ceramica team.

Professional career

The 1973 Giro d'Italia that began in Verviers in Belgium and was Battaglin's debut in a grand tour. Battaglin immediately showed promise when he finished third on stage four ahead of Eddy Merckx and José Manuel Fuente. By halfway through the race, Battaglin was sitting in second place overall behind Merckx but lost that placing to Felice Gimondi. Still at the age of 21, the neo-pro astonished the cycling world by finishing third in the race. Battaglin would wear the maglia rosa for five days in the 1975 Giro d'Italia as well as several stage wins and wins in smaller stage races. He also won the King of the Mountains jersey in the 1979 Tour de France, even after he received a penalty for testing positive for doping. Battaglin finished third in the 1980 Giro d'Italia.

The following year on the tenth stage mountain time trial of the 1981 Vuelta a España which was on the long climb to Sierra Nevada, Battaglin won the stage and took over the leader's jersey. The only threat to Battaglin's lead was Pedro Muñoz. Battaglin and his Inoxpran team withstood the challenge from the Spanish and brought Battaglin to his first grand tour victory. Three days later after Battalin's triumph in Spain on 13 May 1981, he began the 1981 Giro d'Italia. On the 19th stage toward the end of the race, Battaglin won the stage to Mareo and took the maglia rosa from Silvano Contini. He withstood the final test – the final stage's individual time trial to win the race in Verona ahead of Tommy Prim. Battaglin was only the second rider after Eddy Merckx to win the Vuelta-Giro double. In the space of one and a half months, Battaglin won two of the grand tours.

Retirement
Battaglin retired after the 1984 season. In 1982 Battaglin started a bicycle manufacturing business with the same name, which he runs from Marostica, Italy. In 2002 the company sponsored the Ceramiche Panaria Fiordo squad.

Career achievements

Major results

1971
Gran Premio Palio del Recioto
1972
Giro d'Italia (amateurs)
1973
Giro del Lazio
1974
Giro dell'Appennino
Morrovalle
1975
2 stages in the Giro d'Italia
1 stage in the Volta a Catalunya
Giro di Puglia (con 1 vittoria di tappa)
Coppa Sabatini
1976
 1st Stage 2 Tour de France
1977
Carpineti
Gran Premio di Montelupo
1978
Coppa Bernocchi
Acicatena
3 stages in the Tour de Suisse
1979
 1st  Mountains classification Tour de France
 1st  Overall Tour of the Basque Country
1st Stages &
Giro della Provincia di Reggio Calabria
1 stage in the Tour de Suisse
Coppa Agostoni
Coppa Placci
Trofeo Matteotti
Trofeo Pantalica
Col San Martino
1980
 1st Stage 18 Giro d'Italia
 1st Milano–Torino
Coppa Placci
Zambana di Trento
Milano–Vignola
1981
 1st  Overall Giro d'Italia
1st Stage 19
 1st  Overall Vuelta a España
1st Stage 10
1983
Lariano
1984
Col San Martino

Grand Tour general classification results timeline

References

External links
Website from Battaglin cycles

1951 births
Living people
Doping cases in cycling
Italian sportspeople in doping cases
People from Marostica
Italian male cyclists
Italian Tour de France stage winners
Giro d'Italia winners
Italian Giro d'Italia stage winners
Vuelta a España winners
Italian Vuelta a España stage winners
Tour de Suisse stage winners
Cyclists from the Province of Vicenza